Discord is a compilation album by punk rock band Bomb Factory.  It was released exclusively in Europe on MHP/Skalopards Records and includes all tracks from the Discord maxi single and Fat Boost mini album (with the exception of the hidden track), as well as the popular track "Exciter".

Track listing

External links
Bomb Factory's official website

Bomb Factory (band) albums
2004 compilation albums